Yuri Vasilyevich Saukh (14 September 1951 – 2 January 2021) was a Soviet football player and Russian coach and manager.

International career
Saukh made his debut for USSR on May 26, 1976 in a friendly against Hungary.

External links
  Profile

1951 births
2021 deaths
Soviet footballers
Soviet Union international footballers
Russian footballers
Russian football managers
FC Rotor Volgograd players
FC SKA Rostov-on-Don players
PFC CSKA Moscow players
FC Lokomotiv Moscow players
FC Dynamo Stavropol players

Association football defenders